The following Swaminarayan temples are located in the U.S. state of New Jersey:

 Shree Swaminarayan Temple, New Jersey (Secaucus)
 Shri Swaminarayan Mandir, New Jersey (Colonia)
 Shri Swaminarayan Mandir, New Jersey (South Jersey)
 Shri Swaminarayan Mandir, New Jersey (Weehawken)
 Shri Swaminarayan Mandir, New Jersey (Somerset)
 Shri Swaminarayan Mandir, New Jersey (Parsippany)

Hindu temples in New Jersey
Swaminarayan temples